Uluwatu Temple is a Balinese Hindu sea temple (Pura Segara) located in Uluwatu (South Kuta, Badung). The temple is regarded as one of the sad kahyangan and is dedicated to Sang Hyang Widhi Wasa in his manifestation as Rudra.

History and etymology
The temple (pura in Balinese) is built at the edge (ulu) of a  cliff or rock (watu) projecting into the sea. In folklore, this rock is said to be part of Dewi Danu's petrified barque.

Though a small temple was claimed to have existed earlier, the structure was significantly expanded by a Javanese sage, Empu Kuturan in the 11th Century. Another sage from East Java, Dang Hyang Nirartha is credited for constructing the padmasana shrines and it is said that he attained moksha here, an event called ngeluhur ("to go up") locally. This has resulted in the temple's epithet Luhur.

Monkeys

The temple is inhabited by monkeys (Macaca fascicularis), who are notorious for snatching visitors' belongings, such as flip-flops, cameras, and sunglasses. They can usually be persuaded into ransoming the items for fruit, nuts, or candies, although this only encourages them to steal more.

Scientist and experts on primate behavior have conducted studies on the Macaque monkeys in the area and have collected data suggesting that they learn bartering behavior.  This trade is passed down to the young offspring.  New groups of Macaque monkeys introduced into the area quickly adapt and learn the new skill from the locals.

Kecak Dance performance

A Kecak dance performance based on the Ramayana is performed daily in Uluwatu temple at every 6pm on the cliff-side. The performance which is outdoors also shows the beautiful sunset at the background of the performance.

References

Further reading
 Julian Davison, Nengah Enu, Bruce Granquist, Luca Invernizzi Tettoni (2003) Introduction to Balinese architecture (Illustrated by Nengah Enu, Bruce Granquist) Tuttle Publishing,

External links

11th-century Hindu temples
Balinese sea temples
Hindu temples in Indonesia
Cultural Properties of Indonesia in Bali